is a manga series and a PlayStation 2 video game created by Namco. The video game and manga were both initially released in Japan in 2003. Studio Deen produced a 12-episode comedy, adventure, anime television series broadcast  on TBS in Japan in 2004. The series was originally licensed in North America by ADV Films who initially released the series in three English language DVD volumes in 2005 and 2006.

Plot summary
Tomokazu Mikuri, the main character in the game and anime, turns 16 years old and has led a dull life without girls. On the night of his birthday, he dreams of a strange world in which he sees a young girl in a blue outfit fighting against an unknown enemy. Tomokazu has a strange, unknown power which seems to "power up" this girl, who has fallen into his arms. She uses this "power" to repel enemies, the alien race known as the Feydooms, who are attempting to break through the dream world and take over the real world.

Waking up, Tomokazu is amazed at his dream's realism, thinking of his strange power and the mysterious girl who fought off her enemies. Rolling over, he sees the girl from his dream, Mone, in bed next to him. Soon Tomokazu, his classmate Mizuki Agatsuma, Mone, Neneko, Nanase, and her sister Kuyou enter the dream world Moera to destroy the Feydooms and save the world.

Characters
 A helpless 16-year-old high school student with many friends, he is unknowingly the Destiny Transformer who is meant to change the world. He enjoys taking care of kids like Neneko and Mone. He is a pervert and unknowingly shows it very much. Though he is kind, he is lazy and does not enjoy studying. His parents died at a young age, he lives with his guardian and cousin, Nanase. His fighting suit is black and dark red with a red gem embedded in the chest. He has a crush on Mizuki in the anime and does not like when Ishikari acts perverted toward her and Mone. His special attack is "Tomokazu Kick". 

 A small 10-year-old girl who Tomokazu first finds in Moera. Her speech is limited to saying her name, or mixed-up parts of it. She seems to be attached to Tomokazu. Her hair has a purplish tint, and her fighting suit is blue and white with an orange gem in the breast. In truth, she is the Priestess of Sleep, who has no real body. This means she is incredibly powerful in Moera. Her special attack is "Monemonemone". 

 Tomokazu's childhood friend. She is also 16, kind and thoughtful, and is always there for her friends. She secretly loves Tomakazu. She is also very conservative about her body. She has long red hair, and her fighting suit is pink with a pink gem in the breast. Her special attack is "Spiral Power Flare" and "Flare Explosion." 

 Tomokazu's cousin and guardian. Ever since Tomokazu's parents died, they have been together as a family. She works for the Head Family and has been watching Tomokazu ever since he was little. She is a well-endowed twenty-something graduate student, and despite their relationship, she enjoys putting Tomokazu's face in her expansive bust. She appears to have feelings for Tomokazu; she once asked him if she had a chance for his love. She has long brown hair, and her fighting suit is green and black with a dark red gem in the breast. In Moera, she takes on the form of "Silk", a powerful warrior with extensive knowledge of Moera. Her special attack is "Hydro Punisher". 

 Nanase's younger sister. She is 14 and has known Tomokazu since she was little, but she emigrated to America. She calls Tomokazu "Tomo", and frequently calls him a pervert. She also starts many of her sentences with "Frankly". She has sea green hair pulled into pigtails, and her fighting suit is yellow with a green gem in the breast. She holds the Arrow of Destiny, a powerful technique made to destroy the Feydooms. Her special attack is "Collider Bit". 

 A cat-loving 9-year-old junior detective, who considers everything a mystery. She calls Tomokazu "Darling", and herself, "Darling's wife". Like Mone, she often displays her behind to him. She owns a large mallet marked . She has a unique manner of speech, constantly using phrase such as "Really, it is!" and "Y'know!" She houses the spirit Neito inside her body. She wears a yellow cap that appears to conceal real cat ears, and her fighting suit is orange with a green gem in the breast. Whether or not she has real cat ears has yet to be confirmed, but they twitch when she is excited. Her special attack is "Super Extreme Tornado Attack" and "Calamity Ripper". 

 The spirit of a reverse re-incarnating woman from the future. She lives in Neneko's body and takes over when Neneko sleeps. In her future, the world has been destroyed by the Feydooms, so she goes back in time to help Tomokazu. In the end, she appears to be Neneko's twin sister. She also has a little grey cat named "Keito". 

 Neneko's cat, who only appears in the anime. She seems to understand humans. She originally did not trust Neito. She eventually is able to go to Moera. 

 A friend of Tomokazu and Mizuki. She is one of Tomokazu's childhood friends. She is a teen idol, who dresses up in a bunny costume to the delight of her fans. 

 Teacher of Tomokazu's class. He is kind to all his students, except Tomokazu, against whom he holds a grudge, though Tomokazu said he used to be kind. He has a heavy lolita fetish, which he openly admits to. As a result, he appears even more perverted than Tomokazu. 

Tomoko Mikuri Tomokazu's mother. She was the Destiny Transformer sixteen years ago, but was unable to destroy the Feydooms. She sacrificed her life to slow down the Feydooms, and passed on her power to Tomokazu at birth. 

Tomokazu's Father He brings Tomokazu to the Head of the Family, whom he works for in a position of middling authority. He is just as lazy as Tomokazu and makes bad katsudon.

Head of the Family As his name states, he runs operations in the family, and expects Tomokazu to listen to him, which he doesn't.

See also
 List of Yumeria episodes

References

External links
 Anime Network - Watch - Yumeria
 
 Official Namco Yumeria game website 
 TV Animation "Yumeria" Official Site 

Yumeria